Pyraustimorpha is a monotypic moth genus of the family Crambidae described by Ahmet Ömer Koçak and Selma Seven in 1995. It contains only one species, Pyraustimorpha inexpectata, which is found in Turkey.

References

Pyraustinae
Crambidae genera